Rebecca Earle  (born 1964) is a historian, specialising in the history of food and colonial and 19th-century Spanish America. She is a professor in the Department of History at the University of Warwick. She is married to Matt Western, MP for Warwick and Leamington.

Biography
Earle completed her undergraduate studies at Bryn Mawr College in 1986. She then undertook three successive post-graduate degrees at the University of Warwick: MSc in Maths (1987), MA in history (1990), and PhD in history (1994).

Her 2008 book The Return of the Native: Indians and Mythmaking in Spanish America, 1810-1930 was awarded an Honorable Mention in the 2008 Bolton-Johnson Prize by the Conference on Latin American History. Earle's 2013 book The Body of the Conquistador. Food, Race, and the Colonial Experience in South America, 1492-1700 won the prize outright in 2013.

Earle has written articles about food history for The Independent, The Conversation, BBC History Magazine, and The Sunday Telegraph.

Earle was elected as a Fellow of the British Academy in 2020.

She is a member of the Editorial Board for Past & Present.

Select publications
Earle, R. 2020 Feeding the People: The Politics of the Potato. Cambridge University Press.
Earle, R. 2012. The Body of the Conquistador: Food, Race and the Colonial Experience in Spanish America, 1492-1700. Cambridge University Press.
Earle, R. 2008. The Return of the Native: Indians and Mythmaking in Spanish America, 1810-1930. Duke University Press.
Earle, R. 2000. Spain and the Independence of Colombia. University of Exeter Press. Spanish Translation: España y la independencia de Colombia, Banco de la República (Bogotá, 2014).

References

1964 births
Fellows of the British Academy
Living people
Academics of the University of Warwick
Alumni of the University of Warwick
Bryn Mawr College alumni
Food historians
Historians of Colonial North America
Historians of Latin America
American women historians
21st-century American women